Neerabup Power Station is situated on the northern outskirts of Perth, Western Australia near the locality of Pinjar and the Pinjar Power Station. It is powered by natural gas, and has a total electrical generation capacity of 330 MW and includes a 30 km high-pressure gas linepack pipeline connected to the Dampier to Bunbury Natural Gas Pipeline.

The station was commissioned in October 2009.

References

External links

ERM Power page on Neerabup Power Station
ERM Power Fact Sheet

Natural gas-fired power stations in Western Australia
Neerabup, Western Australia